The 1942 Poplar South by-election was a by-election held on 12 August 1942 for the British House of Commons constituency of Poplar South, which covered the Isle of Dogs and Poplar in the Metropolitan Borough of Poplar.

Vacancy

The by-election was caused by the death of the constituency's Labour Party Member of Parliament (MP) David Morgan Adams, who had held the seat since the  1931 general election. The result at the last election was;

In accordance with the war-time electoral pact, neither the Conservative nor the Liberal parties fielded a candidate. The Labour candidate, William Henry Guy, was opposed by the Revd. P. Figgis, who stood as a "Christian Socialist".

Result 
With many men away at war, an electoral register which had not been updated for years, and the seat a safe Labour one, turnout was extremely low at 8.5%.  This is the lowest turnout recorded in any UK Parliamentary election since at least the 1918 general election, which was the beginning of universal suffrage in the United Kingdom.  Labour retained the seat easily.

References

See also 
 List of United Kingdom by-elections
 Poplar South constituency
 1914 Poplar by-election
 United Kingdom by-election records

Poplar South,1942
Poplar South by-election
Poplar South by-election
Poplar South,1942
Poplar South by-election